Sary-Aygyr (Harı Ayğır) is a rural locality (a village) in Chekmagushevsky District, Bashkortostan, Russia. The population was 16 as of 2010. There is 1 street.

Geography 
Sary-Aygyr is located 29 km northwest of Chekmagush (the district's administrative centre) by road. Starobalakovo is the nearest rural locality.

References 

Rural localities in Chekmagushevsky District